McKinnon is an unincorporated community in Houston County, Tennessee, United States. Houston County Airport is located in McKinnon, as is the eastern terminus of a ferry across the Tennessee River operated by the Tennessee Department of Transportation.

McKinnon once had a post office, which opened in 1888. The post office was located in a general store run by Norman McKinnon, who was also the first postmaster.

Notes

Unincorporated communities in Houston County, Tennessee
Unincorporated communities in Tennessee
Tennessee populated places on the Tennessee River